The HM-19 "Goldenbears" is a disestablished U.S. Navy Reserve MH-53E Sea Dragon helicopter mine countermeasures squadron, formerly based at NAS Alameda, California, United States.

On November 5, 1994, this squadron integrated with HM-15 "Blackhawks", a "regular Navy" or "Active Duty" squadron.  HM-19 was disestablished, and the integrated squadron maintained the HM-15 designation.  In 1995, NAS Alameda, California, United States was selected for closure by the Base Realignment and Closure commission, and subsequently, the permanent duty station of HM-15 moved to Naval Air Station Corpus Christi, Texas and then subsequently to Naval Station Norfolk, Virginia.

Helicopter anti-submarine squadrons of the United States Navy
Military units and formations in California